SM U-81 was one of the 329 submarines serving in the Imperial German Navy (Kaiserliche Marine) in World War I.
U-81 was engaged in naval warfare and took part in the First Battle of the Atlantic.

U-81 had one 10.5 cm gun with 140–240 rounds. She then shelled the drifting hulk until being chased away by the  sloop . Laburnum took the floating hulk under tow, but the line parted in the rough seas, and Mantola was left to sink, which she did on 9 February. She was torpedoed and sunk west of Ireland on 1 May 1917 by HMS E54; 31 of her crew died, there were seven survivors.

Design
German Type U 81 submarines were preceded by the shorter Type UE I submarines. U-81 had a displacement of  when at the surface and  while submerged. The submarine was powered by two  engines for use while surfaced, and two  engines for use while submerged. She had two propeller shafts.

U-81 was fitted with four  torpedo tubes (one at the starboard bow and one starboard stern), twelve to sixteen torpedoes, and one  SK L/45 deck gun. She had a complement of thirty-five (thirty-one crew members and four officers).

Summary of raiding history

References

Notes

Citations

Bibliography

World War I submarines of Germany
German Type U 81 submarines
1916 ships
Ships built in Kiel
U-boats commissioned in 1916
Maritime incidents in 1917
U-boats sunk in 1917
U-boats sunk by British submarines
World War I shipwrecks in the Atlantic Ocean